The 2010 Sangin airstrike refers to a NATO attack which killed and injured many Afghan civilians, Most of whom were women and children, in the village of Sangin in Helmand province, Afghanistan on July 23, 2010.

The Afghan government claims that a helicopter-gunship rocket strike killed 52 civilians. Many other civilians including children were also injured and treated at Kandahar hospital. For weeks, US military and North Atlantic Treaty Organization (NATO) officials denied that there had been any such incident.

About 200-400 people took to the streets in Kabul protesting the killing of civilians by foreign troops, carrying photos of those who died in the airstrike.

The Karzai government sent investigators to the scene of the incident, who concluded that 39 civilians were killed in the rocket strike, lower than the initially reported 45–52. According to their investigation all 39 dead are women or children.

See also
Azizabad airstrike
Haska Meyna wedding party airstrike
Granai airstrike
2009 Kunduz airstrike
 Uruzgan helicopter attack

References

External links 
Rethink Afghanistan Footage Exposes One of the Worst Civilian Casualty Incidents of the War
NATO Forces in Afghanistan Can’t Deny They Killed Civilians in Sangin Anymore

Massacres in Afghanistan
2010 in Afghanistan
Mass murder in 2010
Airstrikes during the War in Afghanistan (2001–2021)
Civilian casualties in the War in Afghanistan (2001–2021)
July 2010 events in Afghanistan
Attacks in Afghanistan in 2010
2010 airstrikes